Vivian King (born 4 April 1930) is a Canadian former freestyle swimmer. She competed in two events at the 1948 Summer Olympics.

In 1984, King was inducted into the Manitoba Sports Hall of Fame.

References

External links
 

1930 births
Living people
Canadian female freestyle swimmers
Olympic swimmers of Canada
Swimmers at the 1948 Summer Olympics
Swimmers from Winnipeg
Manitoba Sports Hall of Fame inductees
20th-century Canadian women